Piera, better known Pierina Borsani (3 October 1909 – 26 September 1960) was an Italian basketball player and athlete who competed at the 1928 Summer Olympics in discus throw.

National titles
She won 8 national championships at individual senior level.
Italian Athletics Championships
Shot put: 1927
Discus throw: 1927, 1931
Javelin throw: 1927, 1929, 1934, 1935
Pentathlon: 1934

References

External links
 

1909 births
1960 deaths
Athletes (track and field) at the 1928 Summer Olympics
Italian female discus throwers
Italian female javelin throwers
Italian female shot putters
Italian female pentathletes
Olympic athletes of Italy
Italian women's basketball players
Women's World Games medalists
20th-century Italian women